A live broadcast, also called a live transmission, generally refers to various types of media that are broadcast without a significant delay.

The most common seen media example of the live transmission is a news program or a news broadcasting.

Other types of live broadcasts include:
Live radio
Live television
Internet television
Internet radio
Liveblogging
Live streaming

Live broadcasting